Trye is a surname. Notable people with the surname include:

Charles Brandon Trye, English surgeon
Hindolo Trye (died 2012), Sierra Leonean politician
John Trye (born 1985), Sierra Leonean footballer
Mary Trye (fl. 1675), English medical practitioner
William Trye (1660–1717), English politician

See also
Troye